"Down" is a song by American rock band Stone Temple Pilots, released as the first single from their fourth album, No. 4. In the U.S., the song peaked at No. 5 on the Mainstream Rock Tracks chart and #9 on the Modern Rock Tracks chart.

Release and reception
In 2001, it was nominated for Best Hard Rock Performance at the Grammy Awards, an award STP had previously won for the song "Plush" in 1994.

"Down" appears on the compilation albums Thank You and Buy This.

In 2015, Loudwire and Stereogum ranked the song number four and number three, respectively, on their lists of the 10 greatest Stone Temple Pilots songs.

Charts

Music video
The song's music video features a dark room with two projection screens. A white light continuously flickers in the room as confetti is raining down. The screens alternate between images of the band performing this song at the House of Blues in Las Vegas, a woman in a room that either shows her underwater or surrounded by fire raining down on her, and shots of a coffee mug falling to the floor and shattering. On occasion, the song's lyrics will also flash on either screen.

This video was directed by Robert Hales and Mark Racco.

Covers and other appearances
The song was covered by AJ Mclean of the Backstreet Boys during his first solo live show.
The song is a playable track in the game Guitar Hero: On Tour Decades.
"Down" was featured in advertisements promoting the release of No. 4
The song was featured in The Sopranos episode "The Happy Wanderer".
This song is featured in the film Middle Men.

Track listing
"Down" - 3:49
"Down" (Live) - 3:59
"MC5" - 2:42

References 

1999 singles
1999 songs
Stone Temple Pilots songs
Songs written by Scott Weiland
Songs written by Robert DeLeo
Song recordings produced by Brendan O'Brien (record producer)
Music videos directed by Robert Hales
Atlantic Records singles